Čolić is a surname. Notable people with the surname include:

Benjamin Čolić (born 1991), Bosnian footballer
Dragutin Čolić (1907–1987), Serbian composer, publicist and pedagogue
Elvir Čolić (born 1986), Bosnian footballer
Ljiljana Čolić (born 1956), politician from Serbia
Marija Čolić (born 1990), Serbian handball player
Marko Čolić (1766–1844), Austrian general of Serbian origin
Mladen Čolić (born 1982), Serbian pianist
Nikola Čolić (born 2002), Serbian footballer
Ratko Čolić (1918–1999), Serbian footballer
Tomislav Čolić (born 1987), Serbian footballer
Zdravko Čolić (born 1951), singer from Bosnia and Herzegovina of Serbian origin

Serbian surnames
Croatian surnames
Bosnian surnames